Quotidiano.net is an Italian news website, launched in 2000 and owned by the publishing house Poligrafici Editoriale (whose print publications include the newspapers Il Giorno, il Resto del Carlino, La Nazione).

The website contains mainly Italian and International news coverage, as well as political, sports and entertainment news.

The website is also part of the Italian web syndication Italianews.

References

External links
 
Quotidiano.net Official Archive 
Quotidiano.net Official profile page on YouTube

Italian news websites
Internet properties established in 1999
1999 establishments in Italy